Lucijan Kleva (15 February 1942 – 26 January 2009) was a Slovenian rower who competed for Yugoslavia in the men's eight at the 1964 Summer Olympics.

References 

 
 

1942 births
2009 deaths
Yugoslav male rowers
Slovenian male rowers
People from Izola
Rowers at the 1964 Summer Olympics
Olympic rowers of Yugoslavia
European Rowing Championships medalists